Davis Glacier is a heavily crevassed glacier,  long, draining the northwest slopes of Mount George Murray and flowing to the coast of Victoria Land opposite the south end of Lamplugh Island. The glacier contributes to ice that flows north along the west side of Lamplugh Island and to the Cheetham Ice Tongue. It was first charted by the British Antarctic Expedition, 1907–09, under Ernest Shackleton, who named it for John King Davis, first officer and later captain of the expedition ship Nimrod.

References 

Glaciers of Scott Coast